Elvira Becks (born 8 May 1976) is a Dutch gymnast. She competed in five events at the 1992 Summer Olympics.

References

1976 births
Living people
Dutch female artistic gymnasts
Olympic gymnasts of the Netherlands
Gymnasts at the 1992 Summer Olympics
Sportspeople from Nijmegen